O-Lan Jones (born May 23, 1950) is an American actress, composer, and theater producer. She played religious fanatic Esmeralda in Edward Scissorhands.

Early and personal life
Jones was born in Los Angeles, California. Her first name comes from the Chinese heroine of the novel The Good Earth by Pearl S. Buck. Her father left the family when she was a child. Her mother Scarlett Johnson, a self-described "free spirit", moved their family for a year to a remote Mayan village in the Yucatán jungle when Jones was 15. In 1966 they moved to Greenwich Village, New York City, where Jones began her acting career. It was there that Johnson married comedian and actor Johnny Dark, while Jones was dating Dark's best friend, playwright Sam Shepard. Shepard wrote the role of "Oolan" for Jones in his 1967 play Forensic & The Navigators.

In 1969, Jones and Shepard were married. She went on to star in a number of his plays, including Suicide in B♭ and Angel City. Jones gave birth to their son Jesse Mojo Shepard in 1971. They divorced in 1984 when he left her for actress Jessica Lange. 

Jones is an alumna of New Dramatists. In addition to her acting, she is a writer, musician, composer and lyricist. She is the artistic director of Overtone Industries, a company she founded in 1980 dedicated to creating and developing new works for opera and musical theater. In 2003 she married her longtime boyfriend Haldor Enard.

Selected filmography

References

External links

1950 births
Living people
Actresses from Los Angeles
American film actresses
American television actresses
20th-century American actresses
21st-century American actresses